Harrison Township is one of six townships in Union County, Indiana, United States. As of the 2010 census, its population was 416 and it contained 182 housing units.

Geography

Unincorporated towns
Five Points at 
Kitchel at 
Witts Station at 
(This list is based on USGS data and may include former settlements.)

Cemeteries
The township contains these two cemeteries: Nutter and Railsback.

School districts
 Union County-College Corner Joint School District

Political districts
 Indiana's 6th congressional district
 State House District 55
 State Senate District 43

References
 United States Census Bureau 2007 TIGER/Line Shapefiles
 United States Board on Geographic Names (GNIS)
 IndianaMap

External links
 Indiana Township Association
 United Township Association of Indiana

Townships in Union County, Indiana
Townships in Indiana